Mario Chiarini (born 7 January 1981) is an Italian baseball player who competed in the 2004 Summer Olympics. He's the current captain of the Italian team.

Career

Club
Mario Chiarini was 16 years old in his senior debut, in 1997, for his hometown team Rimini Baseball.

Minor league
Chiarini played for the Arizona League Mariners in 2000.

Back to club
After his stint with Mariners, Chiarini continued his career in Rimini from 2001 to 2015. With Rimini he won 3 Italian championships, and 2 national cups. Chiarini currently plays for the T&A San Marino.

International
Mario Chiarini has played for Italy national baseball team since 2002. He made the roster for the World Baseball Classic for the first time in 2009. He also represented his country in the 2013 edition.

At the 2009 World Baseball Classic, Chiarini made a spectacular diving catch to rob Bobby Abreu of an RBI.  In the process of doing so, Chiarini suffered an embarrassing wardrobe malfunction: Mario's belt split in half.

As a member of national team, he won two European Baseball Championships, in 2010 and in 2012. He missed the 2016 edition because of an injury, to which manager Mazzieri said to be "strange to coach the team without him for the first time".

External links

References

1981 births
2009 World Baseball Classic players
2013 World Baseball Classic players
2015 WBSC Premier12 players
2017 World Baseball Classic players
Arizona League Mariners players
Baseball players at the 2004 Summer Olympics
Italian expatriate baseball players in the United States
Living people
Olympic baseball players of Italy
Rimini Baseball Club players
T & A San Marino players
Expatriate baseball players in San Marino